Gastón Alejandro Sessa (born 15 April 1973 in La Plata) is a retired Argentine professional footballer who played as a goalkeeper. He last played for Villa San Carlos in Argentina.

Club career
Sessa started his career with local club Estudiantes in 1993 before moving down a division to join Huracán Corrientes in 1995. His first major honour as a player came in the 1995/1996 season when he helped Huracán win promotion to the Primera División Argentina by winning the Primera B Nacional.

After one season playing with Huracán in the Primera he moved to Rosario Central and then Racing Club. In 1999, he joined River Plate where he was part of the squad that won back to back the Apertura 1999 and Clausura 2000 championships. He was a substitute for Roberto Bonano in both tournaments. In 2000, he rejoined Racing for another season before moving on to Vélez Sársfield. In 2004, he had a loan spell with UD Las Palmas in Spain before returning to Velez. In 2005, he helped Velez to claim the Clausura 2005.

In 2007, Sessa decided to seek a new challenge by moving to Ecuador and signing a 2-year contract to join Barcelona Sporting Club. He then returned to Argentina in 2008 to play for Gimnasia y Esgrima La Plata.

Sessa has a history of disciplinary and anger problems which ultimately led to his departure from Vélez Sársfield. 
In one occasion he kicked Boca Junior's striker Rodrigo Palacio in the face, prompting his sending off and awarding a penalty kick for Boca. His actions received high cricism from the media, being labeled as a "butcher", a common designation in Argentina for players who commit violent fouls.

Honours

Huracán Corrientes
Primera B Nacional: 1995-96

River Plate
Primera División Argentina (2): Apertura 1999, Clausura 2000

Vélez Sársfield
Primera División Argentina: Clausura 2005

Individual
Ubaldo Fillol Award (lowest "goals-to-games" ratio): Apertura 2008

References

External links
 Gastón Sessa – Argentine Primera statistics at Fútbol XXI  
 Gastón Sessa at BDFA.com.ar 

1973 births
Living people
Footballers from La Plata
Argentine footballers
Association football goalkeepers
Estudiantes de La Plata footballers
Huracán Corrientes footballers
Rosario Central footballers
Racing Club de Avellaneda footballers
Club Atlético River Plate footballers
Boca Unidos footballers
Club Atlético Vélez Sarsfield footballers
UD Las Palmas players
Barcelona S.C. footballers
Expatriate footballers in Ecuador
Club de Gimnasia y Esgrima La Plata footballers
Argentine Primera División players
Argentine expatriate footballers
Argentine expatriate sportspeople in Spain